Eric Campbell Fernie  (born 9 June 1939, Edinburgh) is a Scottish art historian.

Education
Fernie was educated at the University of the Witwatersrand (BA Hons Fine Arts) and the University of London (Academic Diploma).

Career
Fernie has had a long career in the academic and art worlds, occupying a number of important posts. He was Director of the Courtauld Institute from 1995 to 2003 and was President of the Society of Antiquaries of London from 2004 to 2007.

Publications
An Introduction to the Communar and Pitcaner Rolls of Norwich Cathedral Priory, 1973. (With A.B. Whittingham)
The Architecture of the Anglo-Saxons, 1983.
Medieval Architecture and its Intellectual Context, 1990.
An Architectural History of Norwich Cathedral, 1993.
Art History and its Methods, 1995.
The Architecture of Norman England, 2000.

References

External links
Tributes to Fernie on leaving the Courtauld. Archived here.

 

 
 
 

1939 births
Living people
University of the Witwatersrand alumni
Academics of the University of London
Alumni of the University of London
Commanders of the Order of the British Empire
Fellows of the Royal Society of Edinburgh
Fellows of the British Academy
Fellows of the Society of Antiquaries of London
Presidents of the Society of Antiquaries of London
Scottish antiquarians
Scottish architecture writers
Scottish art historians
Historians of England
Academics of the University of East Anglia
Academics of the University of Edinburgh
Directors of the Courtauld Institute of Art